Charles Mincy was an American football safety who played ten seasons in the National Football League.

1969 births
Living people
Players of American football from Los Angeles
American football safeties
Washington Huskies football players
Kansas City Chiefs players
Minnesota Vikings players
Tampa Bay Buccaneers players
Oakland Raiders players